The 2002 Uttarakhand Legislative Assembly election were the 1st Vidhan Sabha (Legislative Assembly) elections of the state of Uttarakhand in India, when the Indian National Congress emerged as the largest party with 36 seats in the 70-seat legislature in the election. The Bharatiya Janata Party became the official opposition, holding 19 seats.

Results

List of elected Assembly members

See also
1st Uttarakhand Assembly
Tiwari ministry
Elections in Uttarakhand
Politics of Uttarakhand
2002 elections in India

References 

Result

Uttarakhand
2002
2000s in Uttarakhand